Fall Brawl '94: War Games was the second Fall Brawl professional wrestling pay-per-view (PPV) event produced by World Championship Wrestling (WCW). It took place on September 18, 1994 from the Roanoke Civic Center in Roanoke, Virginia. As of 2014 the event is available on the WWE Network.

Production

Background
The WarGames match was created when Dusty Rhodes was inspired by a viewing of Mad Max Beyond Thunderdome. It was originally used as a specialty match for the Four Horsemen. The first WarGames match took place at The Omni in Atlanta during the NWA's Great American Bash '87 tour, where it was known as War Games: The Match Beyond. It became a traditional Fall Brawl event from 1993 to 1998.

Storylines
The event featured professional wrestling matches that involve different wrestlers from pre-existing scripted feuds and storylines. Professional wrestlers portray villains, heroes, or less distinguishable characters in the scripted events that build tension and culminate in a wrestling match or series of matches.

Event

Ricky Steamboat was originally scheduled to defend the WCW United States Championship against Steve Austin, but he was suffering from a back injury and could not compete. As a result, Austin won the United States title by forfeit. This was Steamboat's last appearance in WCW as he was fired shortly thereafter and decided to retire from the ring. Following the announcement that Austin was the new champion WCW Commissioner Nick Bockwinkel declared that Austin would defend his title against a mystery opponent. As Austin was protesting the decision, saying he would not wrestle again that night, Hacksaw Jim Duggan was revealed as the mystery opponent.

In the triangle match Vader pinned The Guardian Angel in the first part of the match. The second part, between Vader and Sting ended in a 15-minute time limit draw. Referee Nick Patrick declared the match would continue with an overtime period of five minutes. The overtime period expired with no decision, so Patrick declared the match to be in sudden death to determine a winner. Vader won the match in sudden death when a masked man attacked Sting while Race and the Guardian Angel fought at ringside, distracting Patrick; Sting had knocked Vader down first but Vader got up before Patrick turned his back to the action and declared Vader the winner. As per a pre-match stipulation Vader became number one contender for Hulk Hogan's WCW World Heavyweight Championship.

According to Dusty Rhodes on The War Games DVD, Col. Rob Parker had suffered diarrhea during the final moments of the War Games match.

Results

References

Professional wrestling in Virginia
1994 in Virginia
Events in Virginia
Fall Brawl
September 1994 events in the United States
1994 World Championship Wrestling pay-per-view events